Al-Jalama or Khirbat al-Jalama  was a Palestinian Arab village  north of Tulkarm. Situated close to the eastern banks of a valley of the same name (Wadi Jalama), it was inhabited during the Crusader and Mamluk periods, and again in Ottoman period by villagers from nearby Attil.

Al-Jalama's population was expelled by the Israeli military on 1 March 1950 after it fell under Israeli rule as a result of the 1949 armistice agreement that ended the 1948 Arab–Israeli War. It was subsequently built over by the Israeli kibbutz of Lehavot Haviva.

History
In the Crusader period, Khirbet al-Jalama was known as Gelenna.

In 1265, after the Mamluks had defeated the Crusaders,  sultan Baybars  made a grant of the village land to three of his amirs: Fakhr al-Din 'Uthman b. al-Malik al-Mughith, Shams al-Din Salar al-Baghdadi, and Sarim al-Din Siraghan.

Ottoman era
Al-Jalama was incorporated into the Ottoman Empire in 1517 with all of Palestine, and in the 1596 tax records it was named Jalama dir Qaqun,  part of nahiya (subdistrict) of Sara under the liwa' (district) of Lajjun. It had an all-Muslim population of 7 households,  who paid a fixed tax rate of 25%  on wheat, barley, summer crops, occasional revenues, beehives and/or goats; a total of  12,000  akçe.

Pierre Jacotin named  the village Tour de Zeitah on his map from  Napoleon's invasion in 1799. The French fought a battle here, which is known as the "Battle of Zeita".

In 1882,  the PEF's Survey of Western Palestine (SWP) described the village as a small adobe hamlet, situated on the side of a knoll.

British Mandate era
The modern village originated from farmland, belonging to the inhabitants of Attil. The farmers settled on the land nearby, and in the 1922 census there were 29 villagers, all Muslim. In the 1931 census of Palestine it was counted under Attil (together with Al-Manshiyya and Zalafa),
while by the 1945 statistics  al-Jalama had grown to a population of 70, mainly belonging to two extended families, the Nadaf and the Daqqa.

As the village was constructed on an old site, some archaeological remains were used for constructing houses. The houses were mainly constructed of stone or adobe. In the 1930s and 1940s, some houses were constructed of cement. The villagers, who were Muslim, grew watermelons, oranges and other crops.

1948, and aftermath
On the 3 April 1949, al-Jalama came under Israeli control with the signing of the Jordan–Israel Mixed Armistice Commission. According to Article VI, section 6 in this Armistice Agreement, the villagers were "protected in, their full rights of residence, property and freedom." However, the Israeli annexation of the villages made them subject to laws that had the purpose of stripping them of their land so that the land could then be given to Jewish settlements, and to eliminate the possibility of return.

During the period of clearing the borders of Palestinians, Israel emptied al-Jalama (now consisting of 225 people) on 1 March 1950. They were expelled by the military to the neighbouring village of Jatt, a move that Meron Benvenisti called "unquestionably illegal". The villagers petitioned the Supreme Court of Israel for permission to return, which was granted in June 1952. However, members from the kibbutz Lehavot Haviva had settled on their land. On 11 August 1953, they blew up the remaining houses in al-Jalama, thereby making sure that the Palestinian landowners could not return. The kibbutzniks claimed that the Israel Defense Forces (IDF) had ordered them to do this and had given them funds for that purpose. The IDF denied this. Israel then passed several retroactive laws that legalised the expropriation of the al-Jalama land.

References

Bibliography

Hofnung, Menachem, (1991). Israel -Security vs the Rule of Law. Jerusalem: Nevo, (pp. 170–72, cited in Benvenisti)

External links
Welcome To al-Jalama
al-Jalama (Tul-karem),  Zochrot
Survey of Western Palestine, Map 11:    IAA, Wikimedia commons
Al- Jalama at Khalil Sakakini Cultural Center
Description and primary documents at Akevot

Arab villages depopulated during the 1948 Arab–Israeli War
District of Tulkarm